The S&P MERVAL Index (MERcado de VALores) is the most important index of the Buenos Aires Stock Exchange. It is a price-weighted index, calculated as the market value of a portfolio of stocks selected based on their market share, number of transactions and quotation price. The base of MERVAL is set at 30 June 1986 = 0.01 Argentine pesos.

It is part of a joint-venture between S&P Dow Jones Indices and BYMA.

The corporations and weighted prices that compose MERVAL are updated every three months, based on their market share during the previous period.

As of 30 July 2021 the constituent companies of the index include Aluar (aluminium smelter), BBVA Argentina (financial services), Banco Macro (financial services), Sociedad Comercial del Plata (holding), Edenor (electricity), Grupo Financiero Galicia (financial services), Pampa Energía (energy), Ternium (steel), Telecom Argentina (telecommunications), and YPF (oil and gas).

Historical values

The following is a table showing the annual maximum, minimum and annual closing values of MERVAL between 1989 and 2022. During that period, the index hit its minimum value in 2001, some time before the explosion of the economic crisis, but recovered in an accelerated fashion after that.

The index experienced its biggest one-day intraday loss in history on 12 August 2019, when the index plummeted 16,824.29 points or 37.93% following the Argentine peso devaluation and the defeat of Mauricio Macri in the primary elections.

On July 7, 2022, the index closed above 100,000 points for the first time. This is due to the Argentine economy experiencing chronic inflation that is causing the peso to lose a lot of purchasing power in a short period of time. As a result, Argentine stocks actually lost value in hard currency terms such as U.S. dollars over the long run.

Record values

References

External links
 Bloomberg page for MAR
 Mercado de Valores de Buenos Aires
 Bolsar 
 Historical chart

South American stock market indices
Finance in Argentina